San Bernardino alle Monache is a Renaissance style church on Via Lanzone 13 in central Milan, Italy. This was originally a chapel within the nunnery of St Bernard. The monastery no longer exists. It was built around 1447 to designs by Pietro Antonio Solari. The interior contains frescoes from the 15th century and before. Some are attributed to Vincenzo Foppa. The church was restored in the last century.

References

Bernardino
Renaissance architecture in Milan
15th-century Roman Catholic church buildings in Italy
Roman Catholic churches completed in 1447